The 1986 LPGA Championship was held May 29 to June 1 at Jack Nicklaus Golf Center at Kings Island in Mason, Ohio, a suburb northeast of Cincinnati. Played on the Grizzly Course, this was the 32nd edition of the LPGA Championship.

Entering the final round four strokes behind, Pat Bradley birdied the last hole for a 68 to win by a stroke over runner-up Patty Sheehan. It was the fifth of her six major championships, the second of three in 1986, and completed the career grand slam. With the win, Bradley became the first to surpass $2 million in earnings on the LPGA Tour.

Defending champion Nancy Lopez did not compete; she gave birth to her second daughter a few days

Past champions in the field

Made the cut

Source:

Missed the cut

Source:
Nancy Lopez (1978, 1985) and Donna Caponi  (1979, 1981) did not play

Final leaderboard
Sunday, June 1, 1986

Source:

References

External links
Golf Observer leaderboard

Women's PGA Championship
Golf in Ohio
LPGA Championship
LPGA Championship
LPGA Championship
LPGA Championship
LPGA Championship
Women's sports in Ohio